"Zigeuner" is a science fiction short story by Harry Turtledove, first published in the September/October issue of Asimov's Science Fiction Magazine in August, 2017.
It was reprinted in The Year's Best Science Fiction: Thirty-Fifth Annual Collection, Gardner Dozois, ed. St. Martin's, 2018.
It won the Sidewise Award for Alternate History for best short form work in 2018. It would also be reprinted in Turtledove's short-story collection The Best of Harry Turtledove in 2021.

Plot
The story is set in October 1944 during a different version of World War II, although those differences are not immediately clear. The POV character is Joseph Stieglitz, a Hauptsturmführer of the SS, stationed in Hungary shortly after Germany invaded the country and replaced Miklos Horthy with Ferenc Szálasi. Stieglitz is hopeful that Szálasi and his Arrow Cross Party will be motivated to fight off the Red Army, which has just crossed the country's eastern border. In the meantime, Stieglitz is tasked with rounding up a village of Romani people (called Zigeuner in German), in western Hungary, consistent with the Nazi Party's real life efforts to exterminate the Roma.

It is revealed that the alternate timeline at play when a Hungarian driver describes Adolf Hitler's service in the Austria-Hungarian Army on the Eastern Front of World War I. As Stieglitz arranges for the Romani village's population to be placed on a train for occupied Poland, and, implicitly, their deaths, he further reflects on Hitler's antiziganism, which developed on the Eastern Front in part because of the efforts of Romani on behalf of Russia (who he reportedly saw stealing horses, telegraph wire and boots, leading to unnecessary deaths and injuries of German troops). Moreover, Hitler became sympathetic to the Jews after witnessing the Russians abuse them. Thus, in this timeline, the Nazis are actually accepting of Jewish people, while the Romani, communists, and homosexuals are the focus of Hitler's wrath.

The story ends with the whole Romani village being deported. The narration reveals that Stieglitz is actually a secular Jew. He encounters a field rabbi, who reminds Stieglitz that their people have been made to suffer as much as the Romani have, and that Stieglitz could have just as easily wound up on the train. Stieglitz angrily threatens the rabbi, and then goes about his business.

Award Nomination
Zigeuner won the 2017 Sidewise Award for Alternate History Short Form award.

References

External links

2017 short stories
Fiction set in 1944
Fictional representations of Romani people
Hungary in fiction
Romani genocide
Science fiction short stories
Short stories about Nazi Germany
Short stories by Harry Turtledove
Sidewise Award for Alternate History winning works
World War II alternate histories
World War II short stories